The Women's team competition began on 4 October 2010. There were a total of 16 teams.

Preliminaries

Group 1

4 October

5 October

Group 2

4 October

5 October

Group 3

4 October

5 October

Group 4

4 October

5 October

Elimination rounds

See also
2010 Commonwealth Games
Table tennis at the 2010 Commonwealth Games

References

Table tennis at the 2010 Commonwealth Games
Common